The 1939 Alabama Crimson Tide football team (variously "Alabama", "UA" or "Bama") represented the University of Alabama in the 1939 college football season. It was the Crimson Tide's 46th overall and 7th season as a member of the Southeastern Conference (SEC). The team was led by head coach Frank Thomas, in his ninth year, and played their home games at Denny Stadium in Tuscaloosa and Legion Field in Birmingham, Alabama. They finished the season with a record of five wins, three losses and one tie (5–3–1 overall, 2–3–1 in the SEC).

The Crimson Tide opened the season with a victory over Howard before they upset Fordham 7–6 in an intersectional contest at the Polo Grounds in week two. After their victory over Mercer, Alabama was shut out 21–0 by Tennessee, their second consecutive shutout loss against the Volunteers. The Crimson Tide then rebounded with a homecoming victory over Mississippi State. Alabama then went winless over their next three conference games with a tie against Kentucky followed by shutout losses to both Tulane and Georgia Tech. The Crimson Tide rebounded in their final game of the season to defeat Vanderbilt.

Schedule

Game summaries

Howard

Source:

To open the 1939 season, Alabama defeated Howard (now Samford University) 21–0 at Denny Stadium. After a scoreless first half, the Crimson Tide scored their first touchdown on a one-yard Paul Spencer run in the third quarter. Alabama then closed the game with a pair of fourth-quarter touchdowns for the 21–0 win. The first came on a five-yard Herschel Mosley pass to Holt Rast and the second on a second, one-yard run by Spencer. The victory improved Alabama's all-time record against Howard to 17–0–1.

Fordham

Sources:

On the road against a favored Fordham squad, the Crimson Tide defeated the Rams 7–6 at the Polo Grounds in an intersectional matchup. The Crimson Tide scored their only points of the game in the first quarter. Jimmy Nelson scored Alabama's only touchdown on an 18-yard run to cap a 40-yard drive, and then Hayward Sanford connected on the extra point to give the Crimson Tide a 7–0 lead. Sanford later missed a 33-yard field goal in the first, and the Rams turned the ball over on downs at the Alabama 19-yard line to keep the score 7–0 at the end of the quarter. Fordham then scored their only points of the game late in the fourth after Dom Principe scored on a short touchdown run; however, Alex Yudikaitis missed the extra point which proved to be the margin in their loss. The victory improved Alabama's all-time record against Fordham to 1–1.

This game is also noted as being the second televised college football game after the 1939 Waynesburg vs. Fordham football game played one week earlier. The game was televised exclusively in New York City as it was broadcast over W2XBS and only a few hundred televisions were thought to be in existence at the time.

Mercer

Source:

A week after the road win at Fordham, Alabama defeated the Mercer Bears 20–0 at Denny Stadium in the first all-time meeting between the schools. The Crimson Tide took a 7–0 first quarter lead after Paul Spencer scored on a one-yard touchdown run to cap a 42-yard drive. After a scoreless second quarter, Alabama scored a pair of third-quarter touchdowns for the 20–0 victory. Gene Blackwell scored first on an eight-yard run and Herschel Mosley scored on a four-yard run.

Tennessee

Source:

On the Monday prior to their annual game against the Volunteers, Alabama was selected to the No. 8 and Tennessee was selected to the No. 5 position in the first AP Poll of the 1939 season. In the game, Alabama was shut out by rival Tennessee 21–0 before an overflow crowd of 40,000 at Shields-Watkins Field. After a scoreless first quarter, Tennessee took a 7–0 lead in the second after Johnny Butler scored on a 56-yard run. Up by a touchdown at the end of the third, a pair of fourth-quarter touchdown runs gave the Volunteers the 21–0 win. The first was made by Bob Foxx on an 11-yard run and the second by Buss Warren om a 12-yard run.

Although Alabama was shut out and lost by three touchdowns, Tennessee head coach Robert Neyland said of the Crimson Tide's performance that "I don't think the score indicates the difference between the teams. It should have been about 7 to 0." The loss brought Alabama's all-time record against Tennessee to 13–7–2.

Mississippi State

Source:

After their loss to Tennessee, Alabama dropped from No. 8 to No. 20 in the AP Poll as they entered their annual homecoming game. Against Mississippi State the Crimson Tide defeated the Maroons 7–0 before 15,000 fans at Denny Stadium. The only points of the game came in the first quarter when Charley Boswell threw a four-yard touchdown pass to Holt Rast. Alabama outgained the Maroons in rushing yardage 173 to 65 in the victory. The victory improved Alabama's all-time record against Mississippi State to 19–5–2.

Kentucky

Source:

As Alabama entered their contest against Kentucky, they gained one position the rankings to No. 19 and the Wildcats entered the rankings at No. 15 in the weekly AP Poll. In the game, the Crimson Tide battled the Wildcats to a 7–7 tie in the first game played at Legion Field of the season. After a scoreless first, Holt Rast blocked a Kentucky punt that was recovered by Alabama at the Wildcats' two-yard line. Two plays later, Paul Spencer scored on a short run and Bud Waites converted the extra point to give the Crimson Tide a 7–0 lead. Still down by a touchdown at the end of the third, Kentucky tied the game in the fourth on a short Noah Mullins run and Jim Hardin extra point. The tie brought Alabama's all-time record against Kentucky 17–1–1.

Tulane

Source:

After their tie with Kentucky, the Crimson Tide dropped out of the weekly AP Poll, and Tulane took the No. 7 position after their victory over Ole Miss. In New Orleans, the Crimson Tide was shutout by the Green Wave 13–0 before a crowd of 52,000 at Tulane Stadium. After a scoreless first, Tulane took a 6–0 halftime lead when Harry Hays scored a touchdown on a 69-yard reverse. Robert Kellogg then scored the Green Wave's other touchdown in the third with his three-yard run. The loss brought Alabama's all-time record against Tulane to 12–4–1.

Georgia Tech

Source:

In their final home game of the season game against Georgia Tech Alabama lost their second consecutive game by a shutout, 6–0 against the Yellow Jackets at Legion Field. The only score of the game was set up after R. W. Murphy recovered a John Hanson fumble at the Alabama 38-yard line. Three plays later the Yellow Jackets scored on a 24-yard E. M. Wheby touchdown reception from Johnny Bosch, and after Holt Rast blocked the extra point attempt, Georgia Tech led 6–0. The loss brought Alabama's all-time record against Georgia Tech to 11–11–3.

Vanderbilt

Source:

In their season finale against the Vanderbilt Commodores, Alabama won 39–0 at Dudley Field on Thanksgiving Day to end a two-game losing streak. In the first half touchdowns were scored on a Jimmy Nelson touchdown reception in the first and by a 77-yard Herschel Mosley run and a 67-yard Paul Spencer run in the second. Up by three touchdowns at halftime, the Crimson Tide scored three second half touchdowns in the 39–0 victory. Second half touchdowns were scored on a 20-yard Jimmy Nelson reception and by Spencer on an eight-yard run and by Hal Newman on an 18-yard reception from Billy Harrell as time expired. The victory improved Alabama's all-time record against Vanderbilt to 12–9.

After the season

NFL Draft
Several players that were varsity lettermen from the 1939 squad were drafted into the National Football League (NFL) between the 1940 and 1942 drafts. These players included the following:

Personnel

Varsity letter winners

Coaching staff

References
General

 

Specific

Alabama
Alabama Crimson Tide football seasons
Alabama Crimson Tide football